Cara Ricketts is a Canadian actress, best known for her roles as Mary Lacroix in Anne with an E and Lilly Rue in the 2019 revival of Street Legal.

Born and raised in Toronto, Ontario, she is an alumna of the Canadian Film Center's Actors Conservatory, the Stratford Festival Conservatory and the theatre program at Humber College. She first became known as a stage actress, appearing in 2005 productions of Joseph Jomo Pierre's Born Ready and Stephen Adly Guirgis's The Last Days of Judas Iscariot. Her later stage roles included Titania in A Midsummer Night's Dream, Beneatha in A Raisin in the Sun, Portia in the Stratford Festival production of Julius Caesar, Queenie in The Wild Party Ruth in Harold Pinter's The Homecoming, and Hedda in Henrik Ibsen's Hedda Gabler She received a Dora Mavor Moore Award nomination for Best Leading Actress (Musical Theatre) in 2016 for The Wild Party.

Her film roles have included Across the Line, Jean of the Joneses and Stanleyville. On television, she has had supporting or guest roles in Orphan Black, Titans, The Resident, Whatever, Linda, The Book of Negroes and Revenge of the Black Best Friend.

She won an ACTRA Award for Outstanding Performance, Female from the Toronto chapter of ACTRA in 2020 for Anne with an E.

References

External links

21st-century Canadian actresses
Canadian film actresses
Canadian television actresses
Canadian stage actresses
Black Canadian actresses
Actresses from Toronto
Humber College alumni
Living people
Year of birth missing (living people)